Levi Murray Curren (December 16, 1873 – December 11, 1945) was a Canadian politician. He served in the Legislative Assembly of New Brunswick as a member of the Liberal party, representing Saint John County.

References

20th-century Canadian legislators
1873 births
1945 deaths
New Brunswick Liberal Association MLAs